Christian Party may refer to:

Christian Party of Austria
Christian Party (Lithuania)
Christian Party (Samoa)
Christian Party (St. Maarten)
Christian Party (UK), includes the Scottish Christian Party and the Welsh Christian Party
Christian Party (United States, 1930s), a fascist party founded by William Dudley Pelley

See also
Christian Centre, a conservative fringe party in Germany
National Christian Party, Romania 1935–1938
List of Christian democratic parties
Social Christian Party (disambiguation)